Mir Hoseyni (also Romanized as Mīr Ḩoseynī; also known as Mīr Ḩasanī) is a village in Ahmadi Rural District, Ahmadi District, Hajjiabad County, Hormozgan Province, Iran. At the 2006 census, its population was 301, in 65 families.

References 

Populated places in Hajjiabad County